Love in Vegas (Love in the Big City 3) is a 2014 Russian-Ukrainian romantic comedy film directed by Maryus Vaysberg and David Dodson. The film was co-produced by the creative association Kvartal 95 Studio. It is the completion of a trilogy about the adventures of three friends in search of true love.

Plot
Since the events described in the second part five years have passed. The heroes of the film settled down: they have expensive cars, nice apartments, successful careers, happy families. But the trouble is Alisa, Nastya and Katya begin to get tired of the annoying everyday life, because all day they are engaged in the upbringing of children and household.

While the mothers are completely occupied with their children, the fathers have the opportunity to distract themselves at work and during rare bar visits. They work all day, and on weekends they sleep or take small family walks, turning their life into a routine.

They wished their children had already grown up. Then they meet an old friend, Saint Valentine (Philip Kirkorov), who comes to help them with their wish...

Cast
Aleksey Chadov – Artem Isayev
Volodymyr Zelenskyy – Igor Zelensky
Ville Haapasalo – Oleg Sauna 
Vera Brezhneva – Katya Isayeva
Svetlana Khodchenkova – Nastya
Anastasia Zadorozhnaya – Alisa
Alexander Petrov – Artyom Isaev, Jr. (adult son of Artem and Katya)
Ivan Shmakov – Artyom Isaev (son of Artem and Katya) (5 years old) 
Alexandra Parveva – Dasha (daughter of Sauna and Alisa)
Natalia Parieva – Masha (daughter of Sauna and Alisa)
Agnessa Yudintseva – Dasha (daughter of Sauna and Alisa) (5 years old) 
Veronica Yudintseva – Masha (daughter of Sauna and Alisa) (5 years old) 
Andrey Fandeev – Dima (son of Igor and Nastya)
Philipp Kirkorov – Saint Valentine  
Sharon Stone – Angela Blake
Olga Mokshina – Kristina Arturovna
Veronika Vernadskaya – Tanya
Igor Jijikine – Oleg Trub
Ekaterina Klimova – Anna
Oleg Klenov – security guard of the oligarch
Mikhail Salin – the captain of the police
Dmitry Mikhaylik –  security guard of the oligarch 
Yevgeny Koshevoy – Nikolaychuk (worker for the security agency "Shield and Sword")

Production
The filming of the comedy commenced in 2012, initially in Las Vegas, then shifting to Moscow. Originally, Sharon Stone was to play herself in the plot. She had the idea of including the image of an eccentric rock star who should speak the part with a British accent, as was a trend at the time.

The preceding films of this trilogy are Love in the Big City and Love in the Big City 2.

References

External links

 IMDB - Love in Vegas
 Studio Kvartal 95 - Love in Vegas
 YouTube - Official trailer

Films directed by Maryus Vaysberg
Russian romantic comedy films
Ukrainian romantic comedy films
2014 romantic comedy films
Films set in the Las Vegas Valley
Films set in Moscow
Films shot in the Las Vegas Valley
Films shot in Moscow
Slapstick films
Films about rapid human age change
Volodymyr Zelenskyy films